Michael Laffy (born 16 October 1967) is a former Australian rules footballer with the Richmond Football Club, and was also a contestant on the second season of the Australian version of The Mole where he was revealed as The Mole.

Playing career
Michael Laffy played only 26 AFL/VFL games in an injury-marred career, mainly as a defender.

The Mole
A decade after his retirement from the AFL, Laffy applied to be a contestant on the second season of the Australian version of The Mole. At the time, his main occupation was a builder, whilst he was also known as a former AFL player.

Laffy was revealed as The Mole at the end of the series; he committed over ten sabotages during the series.

See also
List of Richmond Football Club players
The Mole (Australian season 2)

References

External links

Michael Laffy's statistics from Footy Wire

1967 births
Living people
Richmond Football Club players
Australian rules footballers from Melbourne
Participants in Australian reality television series